Maxime Berger (27 June 1989 – 30 September 2017) was a French motorcycle racer, he competed in the FIM Superstock 1000 Cup in 2009 and in 2010.

References 

FIM Superstock 1000 Cup riders
Superbike World Championship riders
1989 births
2017 deaths
French motorcycle racers